Hamilton Walker may refer to:

 Hamilton Walker (inventor) (born c. 1903), New Zealand inventor, engineer and farmer
 Hamilton Walker (politician) (1782–1830), Canadian lawyer, judge and political figure